Mulanabad or Moolan Abad or Mowlanabad may refer to:
 Mulanabad, Kermanshah
 Mulanabad, Kurdistan